Bedford  is a constituency represented in the House of Commons of the UK Parliament since 2017 by Mohammad Yasin of the Labour Party.

The seat dates to the earliest century of regular parliaments, in 1295; its double representation was halved in 1885, then being altered by the later-termed Fourth Reform Act in 1918.

Constituency profile

Geographical and economic profile
Bedford is a marginal seat between the Labour Party and the Conservatives. The main settlement is Bedford, a well-developed town centre with a considerable amount of social housing relative to Bedfordshire and higher poverty index but on a fast railway link to London and other destinations, the town is at the north end of the Thameslink service to Brighton and is not far from Milton Keynes which has a larger economy. The smaller and contiguous town of Kempston is also in the constituency.

History
Bedford was first represented in the Model Parliament of 1295. The constituency was originally a parliamentary borough electing two Members of Parliament (MPs) to the House of Commons, and consisted of the five parishes making up the town of Bedford.

Before the Reform Act of 1832, the right to vote was exercised by all freemen and burgesses of the town (whether or not they lived within the borough boundaries) and by all householders who were not receiving alms. This was a fairly wide franchise for the period, but potentially subject to abuse since the Corporation of the borough had unlimited power to create freemen. The corporation was usually under the influence of the Dukes of Bedford, but their influence usually fell well short of making Bedford a pocket borough.

In 1768, a majority of the corporation apparently fell out with the Duke at the time, and decided to free the borough from his influence. They elected a Huntingdonshire squire, Sir Robert Bernard, as Recorder of the borough, and made 500 new freemen, mostly Bernard's Huntingdonshire neighbours or tenants. As there were only 540 householders, this gave him the effective power to choose Bedford's MPs; at the next election the defeated candidates petitioned against the result, attempting to establish that so many non-residents should not be allowed to vote, but the Commons dismissed the petition and confirmed the right of all the freemen, however created, to vote.

Bernard cemented his control with the creation of hundreds of further freemen in the next few years; at around the same period he lent the Corporation £950, and it is not unreasonable to assume this was payment for services rendered. However, in 1789, the young Duke of Bedford managed to regain the corporation's loyalty, and had 350 of his own retainers made freemen.

Even at other periods, the influence of the Dukes seems sometimes to have been more nominal than real. In the 1750s and 1760s, before Bernard's intervention, a frequent compromise was that the Duke nominated one MP and the corporation (representing the interests of the town) the other; but it seems that on occasion the Duke had to be flexible to retain the semblance of local deference towards him, and that his "nominee" had in reality been imposed upon him. Nor was the outcome invariably successfully predetermined: at the 1830 election the result swung on one individual's vote – the defeated candidate being Lord John Russell, who was not only one of the Whig leaders but The Duke of Bedford's son.

In 1831, the population of the borough was 6,959, and contained 1,491 houses. This was sufficient for Bedford to retain both its MPs under the Great Reform Act, with its boundaries unaltered. The reformed franchise introduced in 1832 gave the borough 1,572 inhabitants qualified to vote. The town was growing, and Bedford retained its borough status until the 1918 general election, although under the Redistribution of Seats Act, 1885, its representation was reduced to a single MP. On the eve of the First World War, its population was just under 40,000, of whom 6,500 people were eligible to vote.

Under the Representation of the People Act 1918, the Parliamentary Borough was abolished; but the town gave its name to a new county constituency (formerly The Bedford division of Bedfordshire). As well as the town of Bedford, it covered the northern end of the county and included Kempston and Eaton Socon together with the surrounding rural area, which had previously been part of the abolished Biggleswade Division.

Under the Representation of the People Act 1948, a boundary change which came into effect at the 1950 election reduced its size somewhat, with part of the Bedford Rural District, including Eaton Socon, being transferred to the Mid Bedfordshire constituency.

Under the Third Review of Westminster Constituencies in 1983, the constituency was abolished and absorbed into the new County Constituency of North Bedfordshire, with the exception of Kempston, which was transferred to Mid Bedfordshire.

Under the Fourth Review, effective from the 1997 general election, Bedford was restored as a Borough Constituency, comprising the town of Bedford from the now abolished constituency of North Bedfordshire, and Kempston, regained from Mid Bedfordshire.

In the latest boundary changes under the Fifth Review, effective from the 2010 general election, there were marginal gains from Mid Bedfordshire due to the revision of local authority wards.

The 2017 general election saw the Labour Party win the seat despite coming second in the election. This was significant as it was the first time the party had won the seat at an election where it had not won a comfortable national majority. This was repeated at the 2019 general election, where the seat was narrowly held by the Labour incumbent, despite the party suffering a heavy national defeat.

Boundaries

1918–1950: The Municipal Borough of Bedford, the Urban District of Kempston, and the Rural Districts of Bedford and Eaton Socon.

1950–1983: The Municipal Borough of Bedford, the Urban District of Kempston, and part of the Rural District of Bedford.

1997–2010: The Borough of Bedford wards of Brickhill, Castle, Cauldwell, De Parys, Goldington, Harpur, Kempston East, Kempston West, Kingsbrook, Newnham, Putnoe, and Queen's Park.

2010–present: The Borough of Bedford wards of Brickhill, Castle, Cauldwell, De Parys, Goldington, Harpur, Kempston Central and East, Kempston North, Kempston South, Kingsbrook, Newnham, Putnoe, Queens Park.

Members of Parliament

MPs 1295–1660
 Constituency created (1295)

Parliaments of King Edward I

Parliaments of King Edward II

Back to Members of Parliament

Parliaments of King Edward III

Back to Members of Parliament

Parliaments of King Richard II

Back to Members of Parliament

Parliaments of King Henry IV

Back to Members of Parliament

Parliaments of King Henry V

Back to Members of Parliament

Parliaments of King Henry VI

Back to Members of Parliament

1377–1427

Back to Members of Parliament

Parliaments of King Edward IV

Back to Members of Parliament

Parliaments of King Richard III

Back to Members of Parliament

Parliaments of King Henry VII

Back to Members of Parliament

Parliaments of King Henry VIII

Back to Members of Parliament

Parliaments of King Edward VI

Back to Members of Parliament

Parliaments of Queen Mary I

Back to Members of Parliament

Parliaments of Queen Elizabeth I

Back to Members of Parliament

Parliaments of King James I

Back to Members of Parliament

Parliaments of King Charles I

Back to Members of Parliament

Parliaments of the Protectorate

Back to Members of Parliament

MPs 1660–1885

 Reduced to one member (1885)
Back to Members of Parliament

MPs 1885–1983

Back to Members of Parliament

MPs 1997–2017

Notes

Back to Members of Parliament

Elections

Elections in the 2020s

Elections in the 2010s

This was the smallest Labour majority at the 2019 general election.

Back to Elections

Elections in the 2000s

Back to Elections

Elections in the 1990s

Back to Elections

Elections in the 1970s

Back to Elections

Elections in the 1960s

Back to Elections

Elections in the 1950s

Back to Elections

Elections in the 1940s

Back to Elections

Elections in the 1930s

Back to Elections

Elections in the 1920s

Back to Elections

Elections in the 1910s

General Election 1914–15

Another General Election was required to take place before the end of 1915. The political parties had been making preparations for an election to take place and by July 1914, the following candidates had been selected;
 Liberal: Frederick Kellaway
 Unionist: Gerald de la Pryme Hargreaves
 Labour: Frederick Fox Riley

Back to Elections

Elections in the 1900s

Back to Elections

Elections in the 1890s

Back to Elections

Elections in the 1880s

 

Back to Elections

Elections in the 1870s

 

 

Back to Elections

Elections in the 1860s

 

 

 

Back to Elections

Elections in the 1850s

 

 Caused by Whitbread's appointment as a Civil Lord of the Admiralty.

 

 

 

 Smith was also supported by the Conservatives.

 

 Caused by Stuart's death.

 

 

 

 

Back to Elections

Elections in the 1840s

 

 

Back to Elections

Elections in the 1830s

 

 On petition, Stuart was unseated and Crawley was declared elected.

 

 

 

Back to Elections

Elections in the 1820s

1826: Lord George Russell and William Henry Whitbread (both Whig) elected unopposed
1820: Lord George Russell and William Henry Whitbread (both Whig) elected unopposed

Back to Elections

Elections in the 1810s

1818: Lord George Russell and William Henry Whitbread (both Whig) elected unopposed
1815: Following the death of Samuel Whitbread, Hon. William Waldegrave (Whig) elected unopposed
1812: Lord George Russell and Samuel Whitbread (both Whig) elected unopposed

Back to Elections

Elections in the 1800s

1807: William Lee Antonie and Samuel Whitbread (both Whig) elected unopposed
1806: William Lee Antonie and Samuel Whitbread (both Whig) elected unopposed
1802: William Lee Antonie and Samuel Whitbread (both Whig) elected unopposed

Back to Elections

Elections in the 1790s

1796: William MacDowall Colhoun (Tory) and Samuel Whitbread (Whig) elected unopposed

Back to Elections

See also
 List of parliamentary constituencies in Bedfordshire
 Opinion polling in United Kingdom constituencies, 2010–15

Notes

References

Sources
 
 F. W. S. Craig, "British Parliamentary Election Results 1832–1885" (2nd edition, Aldershot: Parliamentary Research Services, 1989)
 F W S Craig, "British Parliamentary Election Results 1918–1949" (Glasgow: Political Reference Publications, 1969)
 T. H. B. Oldfield, The Representative History of Great Britain and Ireland (London: Baldwin, Cradock & Joy, 1816)
 J Holladay Philbin, Parliamentary Representation 1832 – England and Wales (New Haven: Yale University Press, 1965)
 Edward Porritt and Annie G Porritt, The Unreformed House of Commons (Cambridge University Press, 1903)
 Henry Stooks Smith, "The Parliaments of England from 1715 to 1847" (2nd edition, edited by FWS Craig – Chichester: Parliamentary Reference Publications, 1973)
 Frederic A Youngs, jr, Guide to the Local Administrative Units of England, Vol I (London: Royal Historical Society, 1979)
 The Constitutional Year Book for 1913 (London: National Union of Conservative and Unionist Associations, 1913)

Parliamentary constituencies in Bedfordshire
Politics of the Borough of Bedford
Constituencies of the Parliament of the United Kingdom established in 1295
Constituencies of the Parliament of the United Kingdom disestablished in 1983
Constituencies of the Parliament of the United Kingdom established in 1997